The Democratic Constituent Congress (Spanish: Congreso Constituyente Democrático) was a Constituent Assembly created in Peru after the dissolution of Congress by President Alberto Fujimori in 1992. Its main purpose was to amend the Constitution of 1979.

President
 Jaime Yoshiyama (Cambio 90-New Majority)

Constitutional Commission

President
 Carlos Torres y Torres Lara

Vice president
 Enrique Chirinos Soto

Members of the Commission
 José Barba Caballero
 Martha Chávez Cossío
 Carlos Ferrero Costa
 Víctor Joy Way Rojas
 Samuel Matsuda Nishimura
 Henry Pease García
 Roger Cáceres Velásquez
 César Fernández Arce
 Lourdes Flores Nano
 Ricardo Marcenaro Frers
 Fernando Olivera Vega
 Pedro Vilchez Malpica

References

Elections in Peru
1992 elections in South America
1992 establishments in Peru
1995 disestablishments in Peru
Politics of Peru
History of Peru
Government of Peru
Defunct unicameral legislatures
Legal history of Peru